Edward Duxbury (born 1863) was a British trade unionist.  He held important roles in both the Labour Party and the Trades Union Congress.

Born in Manchester, Duxbury began working in a spinning factory in the Rossendale Valley when he was eight years old.  Initially a doffer, he gradually worked his way up to become a loom overlooker.

Duxbury joined the General Union of Loom Overlookers (GULO), and in 1913 he was elected as its general secretary, initially serving jointly with James E. Tattersall.  During World War I, he served on the Cotton Control Board.  In 1921, he became the president of the Northern Counties Textile Trades Federation.  GULO was affiliated to the United Textile Factory Workers' Association, and Duxbury served as its vice president.  He also served a year as an auditor of the Trades Union Congress, and was a trustee of the Cotton Memorial Fund.

Duxbury was a supporter of the Labour Party, and served on Chadderton Urban District Council for nine years.  In 1923, he was elected to the National Executive Committee of the Labour Party, serving a single year.

In 1930, Duxbury served on a commission to investigate cotton production in East Asia.  He retired from his trade union posts in 1935.  In 1936, he stood unsuccessfully for Bury Council.

References

1863 births
Year of death missing
Councillors in Greater Manchester
General secretaries of British trade unions
Labour Party (UK) councillors
Trade unionists from Manchester